Lincoln Airport  is a public use airport located two nautical miles (4 km) east of the central business district of Lincoln, in Lewis and Clark County, Montana, United States. It is owned by the Montana Aeronautics Division. This airport is included in the National Plan of Integrated Airport Systems for 2011–2015, which categorized it as a general aviation facility.

Facilities and aircraft 
Lincoln Airport covers an area of 110 acres (45 ha) at an elevation of 4,603 feet (1,403 m) above mean sea level. It has one runway designated 4/22 with an asphalt surface measuring 4,239 by 75 feet (1,292 x 23 m).

For the 12-month period ending September 24, 2010, the airport had 4,115 aircraft operations, an average of 11 per day: 80% general aviation, 17% air taxi, and 3% military. At that time there were nine single-engine aircraft based at this airport.

See also 
 List of airports in Montana

References

External links 
 Aerial image as of August 1995 from USGS The National Map
 

Airports in Montana
Transportation in Lewis and Clark County, Montana
Buildings and structures in Lewis and Clark County, Montana